Crooked River Ranch is an unincorporated community and census-designated place (CDP) in southern Jefferson County, Oregon, United States. A small portion of the ranch is also in north Deschutes County. The Ranch is located between the Deschutes River and the Crooked River near the south end of Lake Billy Chinook. It is west of U.S. Route 97 between Culver and Terrebonne. Amenities in the community include a golf course, swimming pool, tennis courts, saloon, disc golf course, horse riding arena and general store. The  ranch has a population of approximately 5,000. It is the largest homeowner association in Oregon. Crooked River Ranch has a Terrebonne mailing address, but the postal service also allows mail addressed to Crooked River, Oregon or Crooked River Ranch, Oregon. The ZIP code is 97760.

Demographics

History
Prior to European Colonialism, this area was populated by groups of people from what is now known as the Confederated Tribes of Warm Springs.

In 1910, Hillsboro politician Harry V. Gates bought the Crooked River Ranch property from local homesteaders and named it "Gates Ranch". The main ranch house was built in 1916 and is currently in use as a senior center.  The property was named "Crooked River Ranch" as early as 1934. In 1961 the ranch was sold to the Thomas Bell family, who operated it as the Z-Z Cattle Co. for the next 10 years. In 1972 Crooked River Ranch was sold and developed as a recreational site. In 1980, the ranch's zoning changed from recreational to rural/residential. In 1992, the site was rezoned as a residential subdivision.

Education
Primary and secondary school students in Crooked River Ranch are served by the Culver School District and the Redmond School District.

See also
Black Butte Ranch, Oregon
Crooked River National Grassland
Eagle Crest Resort
Sunriver, Oregon

References

External links
Crooked River Ranch and Terrebonne Chamber of Commerce

Planned communities in the United States
Populated places established in 1916
1916 establishments in Oregon
Unincorporated communities in Jefferson County, Oregon
Unincorporated communities in Deschutes County, Oregon
Unincorporated communities in Oregon
Census-designated places in Jefferson County, Oregon
Census-designated places in Deschutes County, Oregon
Census-designated places in Oregon